If I Were You is a 2012 Canadian-British comedy-drama from Joan Carr-Wiggin starring Marcia Gay Harden, Leonor Watling and Aidan Quinn.

Plot
Madelyn, a marketing professional, sees her husband (Paul) canoodling with his mistress (Lucy) in a restaurant and in her credulity decides to call him just to make sure it is him she has seen.

Madelyn's distraught call grips Paul in his guilt and, consequently, he decides to leave Lucy on the spot.

Madelyn follows Lucy and finds her upset and buying a long piece of rope. Suspecting Lucy is about to commit suicide, Madelyn stalks Lucy and finds she is getting ready to hang herself with the rope in her apartment.

To save Lucy, Madelyn befriends her and aiming to help Lucy regain her confidence and develop a career in acting, she helps her get into a production of King Lear. Madelyn plays Lear (as a Queen) while Lucy is the fool.

The script and scenes of the main story are theatrically articulated as the movie pays homage to the theater and the play that has been  embedded in it.

Cast
 Marcia Gay Harden as Madelyn
 Leonor Watling as Lucy
 Aidan Quinn as Derek
 Valerie Mahaffey as Lydia
 Michael Therriault as Rainer (Director)
 Gary Piquer as Keith
 Elizabeth Whitmere as Goneril
 Claire Brosseau as Regan
 Joseph Kell as Paul
 Daniela Saioni as Waitress
 Genadijs Dolganovs as Store Clerk
 Bethany Jillard as Cordelia

Reception
The film has a 13% approval rating on Rotten Tomatoes, based on 15 reviews with an average score of 3.86/10.

Bruce Demara of The Toronto Star awarded the film one and a half stars out of four. Andrew Schenker of Time Out awarded the film two stars out of five. Nick Schager of Slant Magazine awarded the film two stars out of four. David Noh of Film Journal International review wrote, "An anti-rom-com in the best sense, Joan Carr-Wiggin's film joyously revives the screwball tradition with real wit, as well as making one fabulously tart female buddy movie."

References

External links
 
 

English-language Canadian films
Canadian comedy-drama films
British comedy-drama films
2012 comedy-drama films
2012 films
2010s English-language films
2010s Canadian films
2010s British films